, also known just as , is a Japanese eroge visual novel game, originally released by Ciel on 25 June 2004, which was adapted into an adult anime, released as an OVA and produced by Himajin, its first episode being published on 28 July 2006, and second episode on 27 June 2008.

Story
The story revolves around two high school girls.  is a transfer student who soon joins the swim club to get her mind off her parents' divorce. He persuades Asa through photography to capture her beauty, which she takes a liking to, but not at first. Asa is soon taken in by Hajime and intercourse ensues. , the second girl, who appears younger than the other two characters, takes interest in gardening. She overhears Asa and the teasing Hajime in conversation while she is hidden in a sunflower garden (conveniently located beside the club pool). While they engage in sexual activity once again, Natsume takes part by her own free will.

As the two girls discuss their relationship with Hajime at a hot springs, Natsume claims that her love interest in Hajime has lasted for some time, before Asa's arrival. They settle this somewhat small rivalry gently by agreeing to "share" him before the Summer's end. During all this, Asa experiences discomfort and shame in her guilty pleasures, while at the same time giving into them. The first episode jumps from current scenes to flashbacks leading up to their agreement, while the second dwells on the girls' sexual relationship, which is all but affectionate, up until the Summer's end. At the end of the episode, several years pass since then and the girls end up meeting at the same train station to see Hajime once again.

The story of the original visual novel includes one more character which is omitted in the OVA: , who is a friend of Hajime and who also attends the swim club. Like Hajime, he develops feelings for one of the girls and this is explored in the various game paths.

Characters
 
The main male character. A member of the swimming team.

A friend of Hajime. A member of the swimming team.

 
A female transfer student. A member of the swimming team.

 
A twintail-girl. She enjoys gardening.

The old homeroom teacher in the visual novel.

Game

Staff
 Script: Usoya Sasaki Kibito
 Character designs and illustrations: Tony Taka
 Backgrounds: Unspeakable
 Music: Hiroki Kikuta
Theme song: 
(Lyrics: rie kito, composition: Hiroki Kikuta, sung by: rie kito)

OVA
The OVA adaptation of Sora no Iro, Mizu no Iro was released across DVD on 2 episodes, each spanning about 30 minutes. Produced by Himajin, the character designer was Kazuya Kuroda, and they were was supervised by Takeo Takahashi.

Episodes
 First volume: (released on: July 28, 2006)
 Second volume:  (released on June 27, 2008)

Staff
 Director: Bonzou Tokita
 Planning: Kokan Mori
 Producer: Sakura Momoi
 Script: Kaoru Takahashi
 Supervision: Takeo Takahashi
 Storyboards: Takeo Takahashi (OVA 1), Bonzou Tokita (OVA 2)
 Original character designs: Tony Taka
 Character designs: Kazuya Kuroda
 Animation direction: Kazuya Kuroda (OVA 1), Keiji Ishihara (OVA 2)
 Color design: Hino Satomi
 Music: Hiroki Kikuta
Theme song: 
(Lyrics: rie kito, composition: Hiroki Kikuta, sung by: rie kito)
 Animation, production & publisher: Himajin

References

External links

2004 video games
2006 anime OVAs
Anime television series based on video games
Bishōjo games
Eroge
Hentai anime and manga
Romance anime and manga
Romance video games
School life in anime and manga
Visual novels
Windows games
Japan-exclusive video games
Video games developed in Japan
Video games scored by Hiroki Kikuta
Windows-only games